Clessidromma is an extinct genus of ommatid beetle. It currently contains a single species Clessidromma palmeri, known from the Cenomanian aged Burmese amber of Myanmar. Kirejtshuk (2020) synonymised Lepidomma with Clessidromma and included two additional species in the latter: C. tianae, originally the type species of Lepidomma, and C. zengi, a newly described species. Li et al. (2021) disputed the synonymy of Lepidomma with Clessidromma, maintaining Lepidomma as a separate genus, and transferred C. zengi to a new genus, Kirejtomma, in 2021.

References 

Burmese amber
Ommatidae
Prehistoric beetle genera